Events from the year 2003 in France.

Incumbents
 President – Jacques Chirac
 Prime Minister – Jean-Pierre Raffarin

Events
3 March – Speech of Dominique de Villepin, UN against war in Iraq.
10 March – President Jacques Chirac promises to veto any UN resolution authorising war in Iraq.
May – Citroën launches the C3 Pluriel, a small convertible.
30 May – Last flight of Air France's Concorde between Paris and New York.
1 June – 29th G8 summit in Évian-les-Bains starts, with tight security and tens of thousands of protesters.
7 July – Corsica voters reject a referendum for increased autonomy from France by a very narrow margin.
11 August – A heat wave in Paris causes temperatures up to 44 °C (112 °F).
September – Citroën cease production of the decade-old Saxo to be replaced by the 3-door C2. The Peugeot 106 also ceases production by this time.
24 October – The Concorde makes its last commercial flight.
24 December – At the request of the United States Embassy in Paris, the French Government orders Air France to cancel several flights between France and the U.S. in response to terrorist concerns.

Births
19 May – Malo Gusto, footballer
24 August – Alexandre Coste, illegitimate son of Albert II, Prince of Monaco.
17 November – Luce Douady, climber (d. 2020)

Deaths

January to March
11 January – Maurice Pialat, film director, screenwriter and actor (born 1925).
19 January – Françoise Giroud, journalist, screenwriter, writer and politician (born 1916).
30 January – Paul-André Meyer, mathematician (born 1934).
10 February – Alfred Aston, international soccer player (born 1912).
20 February – Maurice Blanchot, writer, philosopher, and literary theorist (born 1907).
22 February – Daniel Toscan du Plantier, film critic.
24 February – Bernard Loiseau, chef (born 1951).
28 February – Albert Batteux, international soccer player and manager (born 1919).
4 March – Sébastien Japrisot, author, screenwriter and film director (born 1931).
14 March – Jean-Luc Lagardère, engineer and businessman (born 1928).

April to June
7 April – Cecile de Brunhoff, storyteller (born 1903).
17 April – Jean-Pierre Dogliani, soccer player (born 1942).
18 April – Jean Drucker, journalist.
23 April – Fernand Fonssagrives, photographer (born 1910).
12 May – Prince Sadruddin Aga Khan, United Nations High Commissioner for Refugees (born 1933).
23 May – Jean Yanne, humorist, actor and film director (born 1933).
24 May – François Boyer, screenwriter (born 1920).
25 May – Laurette Séjourné, archeologist and ethnologist (born 1911).
27 May – Jacques Henri-Labourdette, architect (born 1915).
29 May – Pierre Restany, art critic and cultural philosopher (born 1930).
31 May – Nicolas Barone, cyclist (born 1931).
7 June – Georges Pichard, comics artist (born 1920).
13 June – Guy Lux, game show host and producer (born 1919).

July to September
4 July – André Claveau, singer (born 1915).
18 July – Marc Camoletti, playwright (born 1923).
August – Christian Boussus, tennis player (born 1908).
1 August – Marie Trintignant, actress (born 1962).
9 August – Jacques Deray, film director (born 1929).
27 August – Pierre Poujade, politician (born 1920).
31 August – Pierre Cahuzac, soccer player (born 1927).
27 September – Jean Lucas, motor racing driver (born 1917).

October to December
15 October – Pierre Chanal, soldier and suspected serial killer (born 1946).
16 November – Bettina Goislard, United Nations worker (born 1974).
21 October – Jean Hélène, journalist (born 1953).
22 October – Philippe Ragueneau, journalist and writer (born 1917).
26 November – Stefan Wul, writer (born 1922).
6 December – Paul-Louis Halley, billionaire businessman (born 1934).
25 December – Francine Lancelot, dancer, choreographer and dance historian (born 1929).
26 December – Georges Boudarel, academic and Communist militant (born 1926).
December – Guy Héraud, politician and lawyer (born 1920).

References

Links

2000s in France